Twomile Creek is a  long 1st order tributary to the Uwharrie River in Randolph County, North Carolina.

Course
Twomile Creek rises on the Twomile Branch divide about 1.5 miles southeast of Martha, North Carolina.  Twomile Creek then flows southeasterly to join the Uwharrie River about 3 miles southeast of Martha.

Watershed
Twomile Creek drains  of area, receives about 46.9 in/year of precipitation, has a wetness index of 384.58 and is about 49% forested.

See also
List of rivers of North Carolina

References

Rivers of North Carolina
Rivers of Randolph County, North Carolina